Edward Steere (1828 – 26 August 1882) was an English Anglican colonial bishop in the 19th century.

Life
Steere was educated at London University and ordained in 1850. After curacies in Devon and Lincolnshire, he joined William Tozer (Bishop in Central Africa) on a mission to Nyasaland in 1863. He was appointed Bishop in Central Africa in 1874 and died on 26 August 1882.

Steere spent several periods in Zanzibar, 1864–68, 1872–74, and 1877–82. In 1873 he placed the foundation stone at Christ Church, Zanzibar, in Stone Town, Zanzibar. The cathedral was based on his vision; its concrete roof shaped in a barrel vault was Steere's idea. He also worked with David Livingstone to abolish slavery in Zanzibar. He is buried behind the altar in the church. David Livingstone's aides James Chuma and Abdullah Susi were part of an expedition led by Steere. Chuma was captain of the expedition and both men acted as interpreters.

Works
Steere was a considerable linguist and published works on several East African languages and dialects, including Shambala, Yao, Nyamwezi, and Makonde. But he is especially known for his work on Swahili, publishing a Handbook of Swahili in 1870, and he also translated or revised the translation into Swahili of a large part of the Bible.

Notes

References 

   Steere was never Bishop of Grahamstown

External links 

 
 
 
 Robert Marshall Heanley (1898) A Memoir of Edward Steere, D.D., LL.D., Office of the Universities' Mission to Central Africa, London (Google ebook)
 Dictionary of National Biography entry Steere, Edward, by C. A. Harris
 Steere's A Handbook of the Swahili Language as spoken at Zanzibar original 1870 edition.
 Steere's A Handbook of the Swahili Language as spoken at Zanzibar revised by A.C. Madan 1894.

1828 births
1882 deaths
Alumni of the University of London
English Anglican missionaries
Anglican bishops in Central Africa
Anglican missionaries in Tanzania
Anglican missionaries in Malawi